Erika Marie Hansen (born March 9, 1970) is an American former competition swimmer and Pan Pacific Championships champion who represented the United States at the 1988 Summer Olympics and 1992 Summer Olympics.

Hansen won a gold medal in the 400-meter individual medley at the 1985 Pan Pacific Swimming Championships.  She also received a silver medal for her second-place finish in the 200-meter butterfly, and a bronze medal for her third-place performance in the 200-meter individual medley.

She first attended the University of Georgia, but transferred to the University of Texas and swam for the Texas Longhorns swimming and diving team.

At the 1988 Olympics in Seoul, South Korea, she competed in the B Final of the women's 400-meter individual medley and finished in eleventh place overall with a time of 4:51.03.  Four years later at the 1992 Olympics in Barcelona, Spain, she swam in the event final of the women's 400-meter freestyle and finished in fourth place with a time of 4:11.50.  Hansen advanced to the final of the women's 800-meter freestyle, and recorded a time of 8:39.25 in a seventh-place performance.  She also competed in the B Final of the women's 400-meter individual medley and finished tenth overall with a time of 4:48.37.

Hansen has served as an assistant coach for the Florida Gators, USC Trojans, Maryland Terrapins, and UCLA Bruins women's swimming teams.

See also
 List of University of Texas at Austin alumni

References

External links
 

1970 births
Living people
American female butterfly swimmers
American female freestyle swimmers
American female medley swimmers
American swimming coaches
Florida Gators swimming coaches
Georgia Bulldogs women's swimmers
Maryland Terrapins swimming coaches
Olympic swimmers of the United States
People from Bryn Mawr, Pennsylvania
Swimmers at the 1988 Summer Olympics
Swimmers at the 1992 Summer Olympics
Texas Longhorns women's swimmers
UCLA Bruins swimming coaches
USC Trojans swimming coaches
20th-century American women